The Gateshead West by-election of 7 December 1955 was held after the death of Labour MP (MP) John Hall:

The seat was safe, having been won by Labour at the 1955 United Kingdom general election by over 10,000 votes

Candidates
Labour chose Harry Randall who had been the Member of Parliament for Clitheroe between 1945 and 1950.

Result of the previous general election

Result of the by-election

References

1955 elections in the United Kingdom
1955 in England
20th century in County Durham
By-election, 1955
Elections in Tyne and Wear
By-elections to the Parliament of the United Kingdom in County Durham constituencies
December 1955 events in the United Kingdom